Galliussi is a surname. Notable people with the surname include:

Emanuela Galliussi, Italian actress
Eugenio Galliussi (1915–2010), Italian racing cyclist